Kraków Valleys Landscape Park (Park Krajobrazowy Dolinki Krakowskie) is a protected area (Landscape Park) in southern Poland, covering an area of . Within the Landscape Park are five nature reserves.

Location
The Park lies within Lesser Poland Voivodeship: in Chrzanów County (Gmina Trzebinia), Kraków County (Gmina Jerzmanowice-Przeginia, Gmina Krzeszowice, Gmina Wielka Wieś, Gmina Zabierzów, Gmina Zielonki) and Olkusz County (Gmina Olkusz).

References

 Jura Krakowsko-Częstochowska
 Jurajski serwis turystyczny

Landscape parks in Poland
Parks in Lesser Poland Voivodeship